Malacca–Batavia Portuguese Creole is a Glottolog classification that includes:
 Malaccan Creole Portuguese (Papia Kristang), spoken in Malacca, Malaysia
 Batavian Creole Portuguese (Mardijker), formerly spoken in Jakarta, Indonesia

External links
 

Glottolog languages that correspond to more than one Wikipedia article